The Royal Indian Engineering College (or RIEC) was a British college of Civil Engineering run by the India Office to train civil engineers for service in the Indian Public Works Department. It was located on the Cooper's Hill estate, near Egham, Surrey. It functioned from 1872 until 1906, when its work was transferred to India.

The college was colloquially referred to as Cooper's Hill and I.C.E. College (I.C.E. being an acronym for Indian Civil Engineering).

History
A Public Works Department was created in India in 1854, with responsibility for the construction of roads, canals and other civil engineering projects. It experienced difficulties in recruiting suitably qualified staff from the United Kingdom, and in 1868 a scheme was proposed for a dedicated training college in England. The chief advocate of this scheme, and effective founder of the college, was Sir George Tomkyns Chesney. The India Office bought the Cooper's Hill estate for £55,000 in 1870; and the college was formally opened on 5 August 1872, with Chesney as its first President.

The college educated about 50 students a year, who paid fees of £150 each. The curriculum included pure and applied mathematics, construction, architectural design, surveying, mechanical drawing, geometry, physics, geology, accounts, Hindustani, and the history and geography of India.

By the late 1870s the college was training more civil engineers than were required in India; but, rather than scaling down its activities, Chesney broadened them. From 1878, the college began to train candidates for the Indian Telegraph Department. From 1881, it began to train candidates for non-Indian services, such as the Royal Engineers, the Egyptian Government, and the Uganda Railway. In 1885, the first forestry school in England was established at Cooper's Hill, with William Schlich as the founding director.

In the face of competition from new training facilities for engineers elsewhere (notably at the new "redbrick" universities), the college closed on 13October 1906.

Architecture
The principal building at Cooper's Hill was a mansion house erected c. 1865 for the unprincipled company promoter, Baron Albert Grant, to a semi-Gothic design by F. & H. Francis. The conversion of the house for educational use, the design of the interiors, and the addition of a new south wing (including a chapel) were undertaken by the architect Sir Matthew Digby Wyatt.

Rugby football team
In its day, the college's rugby union team, referred to by its opponents as "Cooper's Hill", was one of the most prominent rugby clubs in England. In the 1870s, it produced a number of famous international players including Stephen Finney, Petley Price, W. C. Hutchinson, N. F. Macleod, and F. D. Fowler.

By the 1890s, the team was deemed of medium strength, and a long way behind the form of its heyday. This was put down to boys leaving school earlier than they had previously, thus the team became composed of men who were physically smaller in stature and physique than their predecessors. It boasted the following internationals who played for their countries whilst attending the college:

Stephen Finney (first capped 1872)
Henry Marsh (first capped 1873)
John Davidson (first capped 1873)
Josiah Edward Paul (first capped 1875)
W. C. Hutchinson (first capped 1876)
P. L. A. Price (first capped 1877)
F. D. Fowler (first capped 1878)
F. Dawson (first capped 1878)
N. F. MacLeod  (first capped 1879)

After closure
After the college moved out in 1906, the buildings stood empty until bought in 1911 by Baroness Cheylesmore for use as a private home.

Later, the site became Shoreditch College of Education, a teacher's college specializing in handicraft education, before becoming the Runnymede Campus of Brunel University (until 2007). The site was acquired in 2016 by the Audley Group for conversion into a retirement village, due to open in early 2019.

Cultural references
The college is mentioned by Rudyard Kipling in his novel Stalky & Co. (1899): one of the main characters, M'Turk, following schooling at the fictionalised United Services College, is supposed to be "going up for Cooper's Hill".

Presidents
Lt Col. Sir George Tomkyns Chesney, 1872–1880
Gen. Sir Alexander Taylor, 1880–1896
Col. John Pennycuick, 1896–1900
Col. Sir John Walter Ottley, 1900–1906

Other staff
Staff at the college included:
Calcott Reilly, Professor of Construction, 1872–1897
William Cawthorne Unwin, Professor of Hydraulics and Mechanics, 1872–1884
Arthur Herbert Church, Lecturer in Organic Chemistry, 1888–1900
Peter Martin Duncan, Lecturer in Geology and Mineralogy, 1872–1890
Harry Govier Seeley, Lecturer in Geology and Mineralogy, 1890–1905
Lt George Sydenham Clarke, Professor of Geometrical Drawing, 1871–1880
Wilhelm Philipp Daniel Schlich, Professor of Forestry, 1885–1905
Alfred Lodge, Professor of Mathematics, 1884-1904
Joseph Wolstenholme, Professor of Mathematics, 1871–1889
Herbert McLeod, Professor of Chemistry
Charles Alfred Barber, botanist
William H. White, architecture
George Minchin, Professor of Applied Mathematics
Dietrich Brandis
Harry Marshall Ward, botanist
Horace Bell (engineer)

Alumni
Ali Nawaz Jung Bahadur, engineer
George Charles Beresford, photographer
Herbert George Billson, forester
John Boyle, politician
David Carnegie, explorer
Lt Col Sir Peter Clutterbuck, soldier and forester
George Coles, cricketer
John Davidson, rugby union player
Stephen Finney, rugby union international
Cecil Ernest Claude Fischer, botanist
Frederick Gebbie, civil engineer
Henry Guinness, civil engineer and banker
Charlton Harrison, civil engineer
William Hutchinson, rugby union international
Christopher Ling, cricketer
Francis McClean, civil engineer and pioneer aviator
Henry Marash, rugby union international
Arthur Edward Osmaston, naturalist
Bertram Beresford Osmaston, forester
Josiah Edward Paul, rugby union international
Gervas Pierrepont, 6th Earl Manvers, soldier
Hugh Theodore Pinhey, soldier
Petley Price, rugby union international
Frederick Campbell Rose, civil engineer
Robert Scott Troup, forester
Frederick Sprott, cricketer and engineer
John Claude White, engineer and photographer
Trevredyn Rashleigh Wynne, railway executive

See also 
 List of historic schools of forestry

References

Notes

Bibliography

External links
The reforms of the Indian Public Works Department

Educational institutions established in 1872
Educational institutions disestablished in 1906
Brunel University London
Indian Civil Service
1872 establishments in England